Growing Up Female: A Personal Photo-Journal (1974) was a "landmark" book of photography by Abigail Heyman (1942–2013). The book pioneered American feminism in photography by documenting stereotypical women's roles.

History 
Heyman introduced the book, writing "this book is about women, and their lives as women, from one feminist’s point of view." The book collected photographs of Heyman's life, "challeng[ing] assumptions about being a woman", and "documented the female experience from a feminist perspective." The black and white images in the book include women doing beauty and domestic tasks such as women as mothers, preparing food, wearing curlers, and grocery shopping. It also contained images of young girls; and demonstrated how female stereotypes were reinforced for girls starting at a young age. According to The New York Times, "[i]n one of the book’s most arresting images, Ms. Heyman photographed herself undergoing an abortion."

Andy Grundberg described the book as "test[ing] the line between reportage and personal expression."  

During the 1970s, the work sold more than 35,000 copies, and was a mainstay of women's bookstores and feminist literature displays, along with Our Bodies, Ourselves.

Notes

Further reading

1974 non-fiction books
Books of photographs
Biographies (books)
Women's studies
Biographies about artists